Coleophora impexa is a moth of the family Coleophoridae.

References

impexa
Moths described in 1988